Touché Amoré / Pianos Become the Teeth is a split EP between the American bands Touché Amoré and Pianos Become the Teeth. The EP was co-released digitally on January 8, 2013, through Topshelf Records and Deathwish Inc. A physical 7" vinyl version of the split was released on January 22, 2013.

Pianos Become the Teeth's track "Hiding" is noted for vocalist Kyle Durfey's softer, singing vocals in addition to his traditional screamed vocals. Touché Amoré's track "Gravity, Metaphorically" marked the band's first song to exceed a longer time length, clocking in at roughly four minutes. A music video for "Gravity, Metaphorically", directed by Max Moore, premiered on the day of the EP's digital release.

Track listing
Touché Amoré
 "Gravity, Metaphorically" – 4:07
Pianos Become the Teeth
 "Hiding" – 5:28

References

2013 EPs
Deathwish Inc. EPs
Touché Amoré albums